The Nauru Regional Processing Centre is an offshore Australian immigration detention facility in use from 2001 to 2008, from 2012 to 2019, and from September 2021. It is located on the South Pacific island nation of Nauru and run by the Government of Nauru. The use of immigration detention facilities is part of a policy of mandatory detention in Australia.

The Nauru facility was opened in 2001 as part of the Howard Government's Pacific Solution. The centre was suspended in 2008 to fulfil an election promise by the Rudd Government, but was reopened in August 2012 by the Gillard government after a large increase in the number of maritime arrivals by asylum seekers and pressure from the Abbott opposition. Current Coalition and Labor Party policy states that because all detainees attempted to reach Australia by boat, they will never be settled in Australia, even though many of the asylum seekers detained on the island have been assessed as genuine refugees.

The highest population at the centre was 1,233 detainees in August 2014. A number of detainees have since been returned to their countries of origin, including Iraq and Iran.

By November 2018, some refugees from Nauru (430 in total from both offshore facilities) had been resettled in the United States, but hopes of the United States taking more had faded. Although New Zealand had repeatedly offered to take 150 per year, the Australian Government refused. There were still 23 children on the island, as the government had bowed to public pressure and started removing families with children, after reports of suicidal behaviour and resignation syndrome had emerged.

In February 2019, the last four children on the island (of an original 200 in detention on Nauru in 2013) were resettled in the United States with their families. By 31 March 2019, there were no people held in the detention centre, which had been closed; however as of March 2020, there were 211 refugees and asylum seekers remaining on the island. As of 13 June 2020, a father and son were the last family left on Nauru; there was one single woman and the remaining people were single men.

In 2020, over 100 men from Manus and Nauru were being detained in a hotel in Brisbane, after being transferred to the mainland for medical treatment. They were confined to quarters under a lockdown during the COVID-19 pandemic, and eventually released into the community in February 2021.

In September 2021 the Australian Government signed a new deal with Nauru to keep an ongoing form of asylum seeker processing centre on the island. There were around 107 asylum seekers remaining on Nauru as of July 2021.

History

2001: Establishment

The establishment of an offshore processing centre on Nauru was based on a Statement of Principles, signed on 10 September 2001 by the President of Nauru, René Harris, and Australia's then-Minister for Defence, Peter Reith.  The statement opened the way to establish a detention centre for up to 800 people and was accompanied by a pledge of 20 million for development activities. The initial detainees were to be people rescued by the MV Tampa, with the understanding that they would leave Nauru by May 2002. Subsequently, a memorandum of understanding was signed on 11 December, boosting accommodation to 1,200 and the promised development activity by an additional $10 million.

Initial plans were for asylum seekers to be housed in modern, air-conditioned housing which had been built for the games of the International Weightlifting Federation. This plan was changed after landowners' requests for extra compensation were rejected. Two camps were built. The first camp, called "Topside", was at an old sports ground and oval in the Meneng District.  The second camp, called "State House", was on the site of the old Presidential quarters also in the Meneng District. A month-long hunger strike began on 10 December 2003. It included mostly Hazara from Afghanistan rescued during the Tampa affair, who were protesting for the review of their cases.

By July 2005, 32 people were detained in Nauru as asylum seekers: 16 Iraqis, 11 Afghans, 2 Iranians, 2 Bangladeshis, and 1 Pakistani. All but two Iraqis were released to Australia, the last group of 25 leaving on 1 November 2005. The remaining two Iraqis stayed in custody for over a year. The last one was finally accepted by an undisclosed Scandinavian country after five years in detention, in January 2007. The other was in an Australian hospital at the time, and was later given permission to remain in Australia while his asylum case was being decided. In September 2006, a group of eight Burmese Rohingya men were transferred there from Christmas Island. On 15 March 2007 the Australian Government announced that 83 Tamils from Sri Lanka would be transferred from Christmas Island to the Nauru detention centre. They arrived in Nauru by the end of the month.

2007: Closing
In December 2007, newly elected Australian Prime Minister Kevin Rudd announced that his country would no longer make use of the Nauru detention centre, and would put an immediate end to the "Pacific Solution". The last remaining Burmese and Sri Lankan detainees were granted residency rights in Australia. Nauru reacted with concern at the prospect of potentially losing much-needed aid from Australia.

2012: Reopening
In August 2012, the Labor Government led by Prime Minister Julia Gillard announced the resumption of the transfer of asylum seekers arriving by boat in Australia to Nauru (and Manus Island, PNG). Australia signed an initial Memorandum of Understanding (MOU) with Nauru on 29 August 2012. The first group arrived the following month. The re-opening of the centres sparked criticism of Australia's Labor Government after the United Nations refused to assist the government on the mandatory measures. In November 2012, an Amnesty International team visited the camp and described it as "a human rights catastrophe [...] a toxic mix of uncertainty, unlawful detention and inhumane conditions".

The MOU between Nauru and Australia was renegotiated on 3 August 2013. Clause 12 of the 2013 MOU allows for resettlement of refugees in Nauru:
"The Republic of Nauru undertakes to enable Transferees who it determines are in need of international protection to settle in Nauru, subject to agreement between Participants on arrangements and numbers".

July 2013: Riot 
On 19 July 2013 a riot occurred at the detention centre and caused $60 million dollars worth in damage.  Police and guards had rocks and sticks thrown at them.  Four people were hospitalised with minor injuries. Other people were treated for bruising and cuts. The riot began at 3 p.m. when the detainees staged a protest. Up to 200 detainees escaped and about 60 were held overnight at the island's police station. Several vehicles and buildings including accommodation blocks for up to 600 people, offices, dining room, and the health centre were destroyed by fire.  This is about 80 percent of the centre's buildings. 129 of 545 male detainees were identified as being involved in the rioting and were detained in the police watch house.

In October 2015 Nauru declared that the asylum seekers housed in the detention centre now had freedom of movement around the island. Given reports that three women had been raped and numerous other assaults have taken place against asylum seekers it was reported that this might actually increase the amount of danger to them.

November 2016: United States resettlement deal 

In November 2016 it was announced that a deal had been made with the United States to resettle people in detention on Nauru and Manus Islands. There is very little public information available about how many of these refugees will be resettled by the United States; initial reports however estimated up to 1,250 refugees would be resettled from Nauru and Manus Island. Then-Prime Minister Malcolm Turnbull indicated that the priority is "very much on the most vulnerable", particularly families on Nauru. On 27 February 2017, the Australian Department of Immigration and Border Protection told a Senate Estimates Committee that preliminary screening had started as part of the resettlement deal, but officials from the United States Department of Homeland Security had not yet been authorised to start formally vetting applicants.

February 2019: The Last children off Nauru, "Medevac" bill passed

On 3 February 2019, prime minister Scott Morrison announced that the last four families with children left on Nauru were about to leave for the US. They would be the last of the more than 200 children who had been held on the island when the Coalition won government in 2013.

On 13 February 2019, a bill which became known as the "Medevac bill" was narrowly passed by the Australian parliament allowing doctors to have more say in the process by which asylum seekers on Manus and Nauru may be medically evacuated and brought to the mainland for treatment. The approval of two doctors is required, but approval may still be overridden by the home affairs minister in one of three areas. Human rights advocates hailed the decision, with one calling it a “tipping point as a country”, with the weight of public opinion believing that sick people need treatment.

August–September 2019: update on numbers
The Australian government reported that as of 28 August 2019 there were 288 people left on Nauru; 330 had been resettled in the US; and another 85 people had been approved for resettlement in the US, but had not yet left.

It was reported that as of 30 September, total numbers of asylum seekers left in PNG and Nauru was 562 (23 percent of the peak, in June 2014), and another 1,117 people had been "temporarily transferred to Australia for medical treatment or as accompanying family members". Numbers for each facility were not given separately.

March–May 2020
In March 2020, Home Affairs told the Senate estimates committee that "211 refugees and asylum seekers remained on Nauru, 228 in Papua New Guinea, and about 1,220, including their dependents, were in Australia to receive medical treatment". Transfer and resettlement of approved refugees in the US was proceeding during the COVID-19 pandemic.

June 2020: Brisbane

As of June 2020, over 100 men from Manus and Nauru were being detained in an hotel in Kangaroo Point in Brisbane, after being transferred to the mainland for medical treatment. They were confined to quarters under a lockdown during the COVID-19 pandemic. The men held protests from their balconies, and protesters gathered outside on several occasions. The 25 men were released into the community in February 2021.

September 2021: New Agreement

In September 2021, the Minister for Home Affairs signed a new deal with Nauru to keep an ongoing form of asylum seeker processing center on the island.

On 6 October 2021, the Australian Government passed responsibility for the remaining 124 men on PNG to the PNG Government. The remaining men were told that their options were either to transfer to Nauru or resettling in PNG. The official number of asylum seekers on Nauru was 107 on 31 July 2021.

Operators
 2012 – October 2017: Broadspectrum (formerly known as Transfield Services) subcontracted Wilson Security to perform the operations at Manus and Nauru. In September 2016 Wilson announced that it would be withdrawing at the end of its contract in October 2017, citing damage to its reputation, and Ferrovial, major owner of Broadspecturm, also announced that it would cease providing services to the Department of Immigration and Border Protection at the same date.
In January 2017, the Australian National Audit Office   published an audit of the government's contract management of security and support services at the offshore processing centres. The report found "The Department of Immigration and Border Protection’s management of the garrison support and welfare services contracts at the offshore processing centres... has fallen well short of effective contract management practice." It went on to highlight several weaknesses and gave three recommendations.
 October 2017 – present: The Brisbane firm Canstruct International contract signed a contract with the Australian Government, initially worth over $591 million. The company made more than $43m profit it its first financial year (ending 30 June 2018). It was intended that control should be handed over to a Nauruan Government commercial entity, the Nauru Regional Processing Centre Corporation on 31 October, but the date was pushed forward. At the time of the handover to Canstruct, the company had assets of $8.

Conditions and human rights issues
On 19 July 2013 there was a major riot in the detention centre. Several buildings were destroyed by fire, and damage was estimated at $60 million. Hunger strikes and self-harm, including detainees sewing their lips together, have been reported at the facility, as well as at least two people setting themselves on fire. Attempted suicides were also reported. Medical staff have been provided by International Organization for Migration.

An overwhelming sense of despair has been repeatedly expressed by detainees because of the uncertainty of their situation and their remoteness from loved ones. In 2013, a veteran nurse described the detention centre as "like a concentration camp".

In 2015, several staff members from the detention centre wrote an open letter claiming that multiple instances of sexual abuse against women and children had occurred. The letter claimed that the Australian government had been aware of these abuses for over 18 months.
This letter added weight to the Moss review which found it possible that "guards had traded marijuana for sexual favours with asylum seeker children".

In 2018, reports of children engaging in self-harm and attempting suicide drew attention back to the conditions at the centre. Children as young as eight were documented as exhibiting suicidal behaviours, and an estimated 30 children were described as suffering from resignation syndrome, a progressive, deteriorating psychiatric condition that can be fatal. Extreme trauma experienced both in their country of origin and in their daily lives at the camp, coupled with a sense of hopelessness and abandonment, are thought to have contributed to the onset of this condition.

Media access
Media access to the island of Nauru, and the Regional Processing Centre in particular, is tightly controlled by the Nauruan government. In January 2014, the Nauru government announced it was raising the cost of a media visa to the island from AUD$200 to $8,000, non-refundable if the visa was not granted. Since then journalists from Al Jazeera, the ABC, SBS and The Guardian have stated that they have applied for media visas with no success. The last journalist to visit the island before the commencement of Operation Sovereign Borders was Nick Bryant of the BBC.

In 2014 the National Security Legislation Amendment Act (No. 1) made it a crime, punishable with up to a 10-year prison sentence, to disclose any special intelligence operation, including relating to asylum seekers. This provided little protection to journalists seeking to report on information from whistle-blowers. It caused professional journalists as well as teachers and health professionals employed in these detention centres, to be silenced. Journalists were prevented from entering or reporting and staff members were gagged under draconian employment contracts that prevented them from speaking about anything happening in Australia's offshore detention centre, under threat of a prison sentence. The Secrecy and Disclosure Provisions of the 1 July 2015 Australian Border Force Act ruled that workers who spoke of any incidents from within one of the centres would receive a 2-year prison sentence. This was later watered down in amendments put forward by Peter Dutton in August 2017, after doctors and other health professionals had mounted a high court challenge. The amendments would apply retrospectively and stipulated that the secrecy provision would only apply to information that could compromise Australia's security, defence or international relations, interfere with criminal investigations offences, or affect sensitive personal or commercial matters.

In October 2015, Chris Kenny, a political commentator for The Australian, became the first Australian journalist to visit Nauru in over 18 months. While on the island, Kenny interviewed a Somali refugee known as "Abyan", who alleged she had been raped on Nauru and requested an abortion of the resulting pregnancy. Pamela Curr of the Asylum Seeker Resource Centre accused Kenny of forcing his way into Abyan's quarters to speak to her—a claim Kenny strongly denied. In June 2016, the Press Council of Australia dismissed a complaint regarding the wording of his article and its headline.

In June 2016, a television crew from A Current Affair was granted access to the island and the centre. Reporter Caroline Marcus presented asylum seekers housed in fully equipped demountable units, and provided with their own television, microwave, airconditioning units and refrigerator. In a column in The Daily Telegraph and an interview with ACA host Tracy Grimshaw, Marcus denied that there were any conditions on the crew's visit, and stated that the Australian government had been unaware of the crew being granted visas until after they had arrived on the island.

See also 

 Asylum in Australia
 Manus Regional Processing Centre
 List of Australian immigration detention facilities
 Operation Sovereign Borders
 Pacific solution
 PNG solution
 Immigrant health in Australia

References

Further reading 

Department of Foreign Affairs and trade – MOU on Asylum Seekers Signed with Nauru, 11 Dec 2001
Pictures inside the detention centre in the submission by Ms Elaine Smith to the Inquiry into the provisions of the Migration Amendment (Designated Unauthorised Arrivals) Bill 2006

Government buildings in Nauru
Law of Nauru
Australia–Nauru relations
2001 establishments in Nauru
Human rights in Oceania
Immigration detention centres and prisons of Australia
Right of asylum in Australia